The year 1911 was marked, in science fiction, by the following events.

Births and deaths

Births 
 January 24 : René Barjavel, French writer (died 1985)
 January 24 : Catherine Lucille Moore, American writer (died 1987)
 February 17 : Margaret St. Clair, American writer (died 1995)
 March 13 : L. Ron Hubbard, American writer (died 1986)
 June 20 : Stanley Mullen, American editor and writer (died 1974)
 July 30 : Reginald Bretnor, American writer (died 1992)
 August 23 : Otto Binder, American writer (died 1974)
 October 2 : Jack Finney, American writer (died 1995)

Deaths

Events

Awards 
The main science-fiction Awards known at the present time did not exist at this time.

Literary releases

Novels 
 Modern Electrics begins serialization of Ralph 124C 41+, by editor/owner Hugo Gernsback.
 Fantômas, by Pierre Souvestre and Marcel Allain.

Short stories and story collections
The Country of the Blind and Other Stories by H. G. Wells

Comics

Audiovisual outputs

Movies

See also 
 1911 in science
 1910 in science fiction
 1912 in science fiction

References

science-fiction
Science fiction by year